The Lebanese National Anthem, officially known as "", was written by Rashid Nakhle and composed by Wadia Sabra. It was adopted on 12 July 1927, seven years after the proclamation of the state of Greater Lebanon during the French mandate.

History
The Lebanese national anthem was chosen following an open nationwide competition. The result of the contest was published in newspapers.

Composition
The music of the national anthem is influenced by Beirut's exposure to Western culture by the end of the 19th century. It was composed by French-trained artist Wadia Sabra in 1925.

Lyrics

Notes

References

External links
The National Anthem – A page that is part of the official page of the Presidency of Lebanon.
The Hymns of the Army page at the official website of the Lebanese Army.
Lebanese national anthem

Lebanon
Lebanese music
National symbols of Lebanon
National anthem compositions in G major